Judith Eisler (born 1962) is an artist based in Vienna, Austria and Warren, CT.

Eisler received her BFA from Cornell University in 1984. She gathers source imagery for her paintings from watching films and photographing stills from the footage. Her works typically have glossy surfaces and feature blurred imagery and light defined as substance. Descended from Pop art and Photorealism, her fluid paint-handling incorporates elements of James Rosenquist’s billboard fuzziness and Marilyn Minter’s bracing aggressiveness. Since 2009, Eisler has been a professor of painting at the University of Applied Arts Vienna (Die Angewandte), Austria.

Collections
Smithsonian American Art Museum
The National Museum for Popular Music, Norway

Awards
2002 - John Simon Guggenheim Fellowship

Literature
Guyton, Wade, "Obscuring the Icon". Interview Magazine, March 4, 2015.
Zhong, Fan, "Slow Motion". W Magazine, February 19, 2015.
Steller, Jessica, "Judith Eisler: Elusive Elements of Light and Motion". Flatt Features, February, 2015. 
Garner, Ashley, "Judith Eisler: Interview". Monrowe, November 2, 2015.
Hofleitner, Johanna, "Judith Eisler: Die Galerie als Kino". Die Presse, December 1, 2012.

References

External links
Official Website

American women painters
Cornell University College of Architecture, Art, and Planning alumni
Living people
1962 births
People from Warren, Connecticut
Artists from Vienna
Academic staff of the University of Applied Arts Vienna
20th-century American painters
20th-century American women artists
21st-century American painters
21st-century American women artists
Painters from Connecticut
American women academics